In the United States, a downtown circulator is a road, bus or tram system to distribute traffic or people through a downtown area. 

Examples include:
Miami, Florida's Downtown Distributor
Pawtucket, Rhode Island's Downtown Circulator
The DC Circulator bus system in Washington, D.C.
Tulsa, Oklahoma's Inner Dispersal Loop formed by I-444 (Unsigned) and I-244.
Kansas City, Missouri's downtown freeway loop
Molly the Trolley of Trinity Metro in downtown Fort Worth. One everyday line and one lunch weekday line.
Lymmo of LYNX (Central Florida Regional Transportation Authority) in Orlando. Four lines.
Music City Circuit of WeGo of Nashville. Two free lines.

Circulator bus 
A circulator bus is a bus serving an area confined to a specific locale, such as a downtown area (downtown circulator) or suburban neighborhood, with connections to major traffic corridors.

See also
Ring road

Notes

Bus terminology
Road transportation in the United States